João da Mata is a 1923 Brazilian silent political drama film directed by Amilar Alves.

The film premiered in Rio de Janeiro on 9 October 1923.

Cast
Amilar Alves   
Nhá Ana   
Juracy Aymoré   
Eugênio Castelli   
Moacir dos Santos   
Angelo Fortes as  João da Mata 
Trajano Guimarães   
Luiz Laloni   
Arnaldo Pinheiro   
Plínio Porto   
José Rodrigues   
José Ziggiati

External links
 

1923 films
Brazilian black-and-white films
Brazilian silent films
1920s political drama films
Brazilian drama films
1923 drama films
Silent drama films